The Blériot XXXIII Canard Bleu was a middle-wing, two-seat tourism aircraft designed by Louis Bleriot. It had a canard configuration.

Specifications

References

Single-engined tractor aircraft
Rotary-engined aircraft
Blériot aircraft
Aircraft first flown in 1912